The 1939–40 John Carroll Blue Streaks men's ice hockey season was the 3rd season of play for the program.

Season
After losing Baldwin Wallace and Pittsburgh before the start of the season, the Penn-Ohio League had to adjust swiftly. The Divisional alignment was abandoned and John Carroll' schedule was rearranged so they would face the Cleveland teams three times each and the Pittsburgh teams twice. It didn't much matter to the Blue Streaks players as the team ran through all of their opponents en route to an undefeated season. Led by senior co-captains Eddie Arsenault and Fred Rancourt, JCU averaged more than five and a half goals per game, never scoring fewer than three and allowed just over a goal a game during the regular season. The team's closest affair was after a long layoff against Carnegie Tech, a 3–2 win.

In the league playoffs, Duquesne fought well, scoring against the Blue Streaks as well as any team in the three-year history of the team, but it wasn't good enough. John Carrol swept both games and captured their third consecutive Penn-Ohio League championship. The only bad news for the season was the poor attendance for the team's games.

Roster

Standings

Schedule and results

|-
!colspan=12 style=";" | Regular Season

|-
!colspan=12 style=";" | Penn-Ohio League Playoffs

|- align="center" bgcolor="#e0e0e0"
|colspan=12|John Carroll Won Series 2–0

† Duquesne records have the game being played on February 1 with the score 3–1 for John Carroll.

References

John Carroll Blue Streaks men's ice hockey seasons
John Carroll
John Carroll
John Carroll
John Carroll